Mueang Yala (Pattani Malay: ยาลอ) is the capital district (amphoe mueang) of Yala province, southern Thailand.

Geography
Neighboring districts are (from the north clockwise): Khok Pho, Mae Lan and Yarang of Pattani province; Raman, Krong Pinang and Yaha of Yala province; and Saba Yoi of Songkhla province.

The main river is the Pattani River, which runs through the town of Yala.

History
Originally only known as Mueang district, the district was renamed Sateng in 1917 to share the name with the central sub-district. In 1938, the district was renamed Mueang Yala to conform with the common name of the central districts of a province.

Five sub-districts are scheduled to be split off to form the new district Lam Mai in 2015.

Administration

Central administration 
Mueang Yala is divided into 14 sub-districts (tambons), which are further subdivided into 80 administrative villages (mubans).

Missing numbers are tambons which now form Krong Pinang District.

Local administration 
There is one city (thesaban nakhon) in the district:
 Yala consisting of sub-district Sateng.

There is one town (thesaban mueang) in the district:
 Sateng Nok consisting of sub-district Sateng Nok.

There are four sub-district municipalities (thesaban tambons) in the district:
 Lam Mai consisting of parts of sub-district Lam Mai.
 Budi consisting of sub-district Budi.
 Yupo consisting of sub-district Yupo.
 Tha Sap consisting of sub-district Tha Sap.

There are nine sub-district administrative organizations (SAO) in the district:
 Lidon consisting of sub-district Lidon.
 Yala consisting of sub-district Yala.
 Lam Mai consisting of parts of sub-district Lam Mai.
 Na Tham consisting of sub-district Na Tham.
 Lam Phaya consisting of sub-district Lam Phaya.
 Po Seng consisting of sub-district Po Seng.
 Phron consisting of sub-district Phron.
 Bannang Sareng consisting of sub-district Bannang Sareng.
 Ta Se consisting of sub-district Ta Se.

References

External links
amphoe.com on Mueang Yala district (Thai)

Districts of Yala province